Twisted Issues is a 1988 splatter film billed as a 'psycho-punk splatter-comedy'.  It featured Gainesville, Florida punk bands such as Psychic Violents, Young Pioneers, Mutley Chix, Doldrums, Just Demigods, Cindy Brady's Lisp, Officer Friendly, and the Smegmas, as well as local speed metal band Hellwitch and avantgarde incidental music by The Bill Perry Orchestra. Director Charles Pinion went on to make several other underground movies (Red Spirit Lake, We Await and the 2014 3D feature American Mummy).

Twisted Issues was originally intended to be a punk rockumentary featuring Gainesville bands, but the inclusion of writers Steve Antczak and Hawk (James C. Bassett) to the mix added the horror, element to the story, featuring a so-called Death Skater who kills characters played by members of the aforementioned bands after they inadvertently kill him. Segments of the movie were written by different people, notably Chuck Speta (Atomic Comix). Film Threat Video Guide called Twisted Issues one of the 25 Must-See Underground Movies of the 1980s. In 2011 the exhaustive encyclopedia of punks on film, Destroy All Movies, had a section on Twisted Issues and its director, Charles Pinion. In 2013, Headpress released Bleeding Skull!: A 1980s Trash-Horror Odyssey, which covered Twisted Issues and other shot-on-video (SOV) movies.

The VHS version of Twisted Issues has been long unavailable. A limited edition DVD (313 copies made) of Twisted Issues is sold from the filmmaker's website.

In 2013, Don Abendroth of The Video Pharmacy released a limited edition (25 copies) of Twisted Issues that included a tiny bloody skateboard and TV set, as well as the soundtrack on cassette, and a new printing of the original booklet.

External links 
 
 Charlespinion.com
 Destroy All Movies
 Charles Pinion Interview: Twisted Issues
 Bleeding Skull!: A 1980s Trash-Horror Odyssey 
 Aztec Blood website

1980s comedy horror films
Punk films
American splatter films